Aurélien Gilles, known as Ponce, born on  in Avignon, France is a French streamer.



Biography

Early life 
He studied in Polytech Montpellier, but reoriented himself towards the theatrical field grâce au conservatoire de Toulouse. Disappointed by drama lesson at Florent school in Paris, he became a math teacher for preparatory classes for the nursing and care assistant competitive examination.

Career

2016-2019: Early career
In 2016, he started to stream on Twitch, and then joined Web TV. On that platform, he uses the nickname "PonceFesse", which he will change later for "Ponce". He has streamed World of Warcraft and the Nintendo games Mario Kart and Animal Crossing.

2019-2020: Popcorn talkshow beginnings
In 2019, he joins Domingo's team as a full-time columnist on the talk show Popcorn.

2020-present: "Ponce la nuit"
In 2020 he hosted the program "Ponce la nuit", first broadcast on LeStream's channel, it then appeared on this YouTube channel, in which Antoine Daniel and Samuel Étienne were invited. He has been participating in Z Event since 2020.

His channel was temporarily banned by Twitch in June, 2021 for broadcasting an 70s film trailer which shows a nipple: this temporarily suspension is relayed by Madmoizelle as a symbol of the exaggerated puritanisme of the platform.

Ponce on YouTube

References

External links 

 Twitch Channel
 Ponce - YouTube Channel
 Ponce Replay - YouTube Channel
 PONCE CLIPS - YouTube Channel

Pseudonyms
French television presenters
Twitch (service) streamers
French YouTubers
Gaming YouTubers
1991 births
Living people